Transtillaspis papallactana is a species of moth of the family Tortricidae. It is found in Ecuador in the provinces of Napo and Tungurahua and in Peru.

The wingspan is about 21 mm. The ground colour of the forewings is cream with a slight brownish admixture. The suffusions, dots and strigulae (fine streaks) are brownish and the markings are brown. The hindwings are whitish, tinged with pale brownish and with pale greyish-brown strigulation.

Etymology
The species name refers to Papallacta, the type locality.

References

Moths described in 2009
Transtillaspis
Taxa named by Józef Razowski